Eacles ducalis is a moth in the family Saturniidae. It is found in Brazil and Argentina.

References

Ceratocampinae
Moths described in 1855